George Lyons may refer to:
George Lyons (theologian) (born 1947), American author and professor of New Testament studies
George Lyons (footballer) (1884–?), English footballer
George Lyons (baseball) (1891–1981), American professional baseball pitcher
George Lyons (born Dominick George Martoccio; 1889–1958), American musician, harpist and composer, part of Lyons and Yosco

See also
George Lyon (disambiguation)
Lyons (surname)